Acultomancy (from acutomancy, the type of acultomancy described below, influenced by Latin acūleus, needle) is a form of divination that uses needles for readings.  

Using needles comes from the olden days where Romani people used to read people and use needles as their pointers.  Readers use seven needles or up to twenty one needles in a somewhat shallow bowl with water in it.  Needles may also be dropped onto a flat surface that has been coated with powder or flour.  Readers then look for the designs that the needles make in the substance. 

Some of the main designs are lines.  They may be broken, parallel, vertical, or horizontal in some fashion.  The broken line may mean traveling or heading on a new journey.  The parallel lines may mean money in the future, either given or taken away.  The vertical lines are meant as guided roads to take.  The horizontal lines may mean what the fate will be.

There is another type of acultomancy and that is called acutomancy.  This practice uses sharp objects or anything that is pointed.  Seven are dropped onto a table and the pattern is distinguished and read.  Another practice along with this one is Acutomanzia.  Acutomanzia employs thirteen pins.  Ten must be straight and three are bent at an angle.  They are also dropped into flour or powder of some sort to discern patterns.

See also 
 Aichmomancy
 Methods of divination

References 

Divination